Sang Khom is a district (amphoe) in northern Udon Thani province, northeastern Thailand.

Etymology
The district's original name was "Ban Sang Khom", only slightly different from the modern variation. A story is told that when the village was first established, around the year 1898, there was some digging going on in a local pond and after some time, khom trees grew around the pond's shore. Therefore, the villagers called the place "Sang Khom."

Geography
Neighboring districts are (clockwise from the southeast) Ban Dung and Phen of Udon Thani Province and Phon Phisai of Nong Khai province.

Sang Khom district is home to Nam Pan Lake, a sizable body of freshwater in the northern part of the district.

History
The minor district (king amphoe) was established on 15 May 1975, when three tambons, Sang Khom, Ban Yuat, and
Chiang Da, split from Phen district. On 21 May 1990 it was upgraded to a full district.

Administration
The district is divided into six sub-districts (tambons), which are further subdivided into 52 villages (mubans). There are no municipal (thesaban) areas, and six tambon administrative organizations (TAO).

References

External links
amphoe.com

Sang Khom